Gaio is an Italian given name and surname, related to the Latin name Gaius. Notable people with the name include:

 Aurora Gaio (born 1999), Italian racing cyclist
 Federico Gaio (born 1992), Italian tennis player
 Gaio Chiocchio (1954–1996), Italian musician